Holy Trinity Church, Rolleston is a parish church in the Church of England in Rolleston, Nottinghamshire.

History

The church dates from the 12th century. The chancel was restored in 1878 and the tower in 1889 by Charles Hodgson Fowler.

The church is in a joint parish with: 
St Denis' Church, Morton
St Peter and St Paul's Church, Upton

Memorials
Nicholas Lodge, 1612, north chancel
Rev John Edwards 1804
Luke Williamson
Selina Hempsall 1750
John Twentyman 1774
John Twentyman 1750

Organ

The church obtained an organ in 1933 which had been built in 1895 by Cousins of Lincoln, and was originally installed in Lincoln Cathedral Song School.

The current organ was formerly in HM Prison Nottingham. It was installed in Rolleston in 2008 by Henry Groves & Son. A specification of the organ can be found on the National Pipe Organ Register.

References

Church of England church buildings in Nottinghamshire
Grade I listed churches in Nottinghamshire